A path is a route for physical travel – see Trail.

Path or PATH may also refer to:

Physical paths of different types 
 Bicycle path
 Bridle path, used by people on horseback
 Course (navigation), the intended path of a vehicle
 Desire path, created by human or animal foot traffic
 Footpath, intended for use only by pedestrians
 Shared-use path, intended for multiple modes such as walking, bicycling, in-line skating or others
 Sidewalk, a paved path along the side of a road
 Hoggin, a buff-coloured gravel & clay pathway often seen in gardens of Stately Homes, Parks etc.

 Trail, an unpaved lane or road

Mathematics, physics, and computing 
 Path (computing), in file systems, the human-readable address of a resource
 PATH (variable), in computing, a way to specify a list of directories containing executable programs
 Path (graph theory), a sequence of edges of a graph that form a trail
 st-connectivity problem, sometimes known as the "path problem"
 Path (topology), a continuous function
 Path (geometry), a curve
 Path, a name for the vectors in vector graphics
 Clipping path, in digital image processing
 Path (physics), a trajectory

Organizations
 PATH (global health organization), an international nonprofit organization in Seattle
 Partners for Advanced Transit and Highways, a research organization operated by the University of California
 PATH Foundation, a trail-building organization in Georgia, USA
 People's Alliance of Tower Hamlets, a minor political party in Tower Hamlets, London
 Positive Alternatives to Homosexuality, a coalition of anti-gay organizations
 Professional Association of Therapeutic Horsemanship, a non-profit organization that promotes the benefits equine-assisted therapies
 Projects for Assistance in Transition from Homelessness, American formula grant program

Other uses 
 Path (social network), a photo sharing and messaging service
 PATH (rail system), Port Authority Trans-Hudson, serving New York and New Jersey
 Path (Toronto), a network of underground pedestrian tunnels in Toronto, Ontario, Canada
 Golden Path (Dune), a metaphysical theme from Frank Herbert's Dune novels
 "Path Vol. 1 & 2", a 2000 single by Apocalyptica
 Potomac-Appalachian Transmission Highline, a proposed electrical line
 Train path, infrastructure capacity needed to run a train between two places over a given time-period
 Path (album), by American shoegaze musician Kraus

See also

 Control flow path, a possible execution sequence in a computer program
 Footpath (disambiguation)
 Pathé
 Pathway (disambiguation)
 Road (disambiguation)
 Route (disambiguation)
 The Path (disambiguation)
 Track (disambiguation)
 Trail (disambiguation)